Francis Clyde Bushey (August 1, 1906 – March 18, 1972) was a pitcher who played for the Boston Red Sox (1927, 1930). Bushey batted and threw right-handed. He was born in Wheaton, Kansas. 

In a two-season career, Bushey posted a 0–1 record with four strikeouts and a 6.32 ERA in 31 innings pitched.

Bushey died in Topeka, Kansas, at the age of 65.

See also
Boston Red Sox all-time roster

External links
Baseball Reference

1906 births
1972 deaths
People from Pottawatomie County, Kansas
Major League Baseball pitchers
Boston Red Sox players
Baseball players from Kansas